The 1951 Washington Huskies football team was an American football team that represented the University of Washington during the 1951 college football season. In its fourth season under head coach Howard Odell, the team compiled a 3–6–1 record, finished in seventh place in the Pacific Coast Conference, and outscored its opponents by a combined total of 273 to 218. Ted Holzknecht was the team captain.

Schedule

Game summaries

USC

The highlight of the 1951 contest came in the fourth quarter when Hugh McElhenny returned a punt from Des Koch for 100 yards, running past Frank Gifford on his way to the end zone.

NFL Draft selections
Two University of Washington Huskies were selected in the 1952 NFL Draft, which lasted thirty rounds with 360 selections.

Heinrich did not play in 1951 due to a shoulder injury, then led the Huskies in 1952.Due to military service, his first season with the Giants was in 1954.

References

Washington
Washington Huskies football seasons
Washington Huskies football